The Mummy, known in Japan as , is a single-player video game for Game Boy Color, PlayStation and Microsoft Windows, based on the 1999 movie of the same name. It was published by Konami.

Dreamcast planned and advertised a version, but the version was cancelled for unknown reasons. The game was followed by The Mummy Returns in 2001, The Mummy: The Animated Series in 2002, and was later followed by The Mummy: Tomb of the Dragon Emperor in 2008.

Gameplay
Set in Hamunaptra, there are 15 stages. There is also a bonus stage called "Cairo". Rick O'Connell is the main game-user, and the players have to defeat enemies such as Slave Mummies and Scarab Beetles.

Reception

The PlayStation version received "mixed" reviews. The PC version received "generally unfavorable reviews", according to the review aggregation website Metacritic. David Chen of NextGen said that the former version was "a lot better than we could have expected – still not great, but not at all bad". In Japan, Famitsu gave the same console version a score of 27 out of 40. Nintendo Power gave the Game Boy Color version a mixed review, over a month before it was released Stateside.

References

External links
 
 

2000 video games
Action-adventure games
Cancelled Dreamcast games
Game Boy Color games
Konami games
PlayStation (console) games
Single-player video games
The Mummy video games
Video games developed in Japan
Video games developed in the United Kingdom
Video games set in Egypt
Windows games